Wangata is a commune in the city of Mbandaka, the capital of Équateur province, in the Democratic Republic of Congo.

References 

Mbandaka
Communes of the Democratic Republic of the Congo